Darwinhydrus solidus is a species of beetle in the family Dytiscidae, the only species in the genus Darwinhydrus.

References

Dytiscidae